Ormocarpum is a genus of legume in the family Fabaceae, and was recently assigned to the informal monophyletic Dalbergia clade of the Dalbergieae.

Species
Ormocarpum comprises the following species:

 Ormocarpum bernierianum (Baill.) Du Puy & Labat

 
 Ormocarpum cochinchinense (Lour.) Merr.
 
 Ormocarpum drakei R. Vig.
 Ormocarpum flavum J.B. Gillett
 

 Ormocarpum keniense J.B. Gillett
 Ormocarpum kirkii S. Moore
 Ormocarpum klainei Tisser.
 Ormocarpum megalophyllum Harms

 Ormocarpum muricatum Chiov.

 Ormocarpum pubescens (Hochst.) Cufod.

 Ormocarpum schliebenii Harms
 Ormocarpum sennoides (Willd.) DC.
 
 Ormocarpum suberosum Teijsm. & Binn.

 Ormocarpum trachycarpum (Taub.) Harms
 Ormocarpum trichocarpum (Taub.) Engl.

 Ormocarpum verrucosum P. Beauv.

References

Dalbergieae
Taxonomy articles created by Polbot
Fabaceae genera